Ranchi Institute of Neuropsychiatry and Allied Sciences (RINPAS) is an unaided government run medical college in Ranchi, Jharkhand.
It is one of the oldest tertiary care centers in Eastern India.

References

Psychiatric hospitals in India
Mental health organisations in India
Universities and colleges in Ranchi
Medical colleges in Jharkhand